Andrej Kračman (born 22 August 1982) is a tennis player from Slovenia.

Tennis career

Juniors
As a junior Kračman reached as high as No. 79 in the junior world singles rankings in 1998 (and No. 23 in doubles).

Pro tour
He has played multiple seasons of Davis Cup including the 2009 Slovenia Davis Cup team.

References

External links
 
 

Living people
1982 births
Slovenian male tennis players
Sportspeople from Ljubljana